George Edward Martineau  (18 January 1905 – 3 January 1969) was Dean of Edinburgh from 1962 to 1967.

Life
Martineau was born in 1905 and educated at  St John's College, Cambridge and Ripon College Cuddesdon; and ordained in 1931. After curacies in Chesterfield and Edinburgh  he held  incumbencies in new Mills, Falkirk and Jedburgh before his time as Dean.

His second marriage was to the pianist Hester Dickson Martineau. They both had previous children, but they shared in a new son Malcolm Martineau, also a noted pianist.

Notes

1905 births
1969 deaths
Alumni of St John's College, Cambridge
Scottish Episcopalian clergy
Deans of Edinburgh